AUSKey was a piece of software designed as an alternate, more secure authentication method for businesses and users of Australian Government websites. The software was developed by Verizon Business, and launched by the Australian Taxation Office in April 2010 to replace client certificates. In January 2020, it was announced that AUSKey would be retired and superseded in March that year by the newly released myGovID. On April 1, 2020 AUSKey was retired. AUSKey was available primarily as a browser extension for Firefox, Chrome, and Safari, as well as a special Firefox based web browser designed for use with a USB flash drive. AUSKey was available in two flavours, the "administrator" and "standard" types, designed for organisation administrators and users respectively.

Participating websites 

 Austrade
 Australian Business Register
 Australian Financial Security Authority
 Australian Prudential Regulation Authority
 Australian Securities & Investments Commission
 Australian Taxation Office
 Australian Communications & Media Authority
 NSW Department of Education and Communities
 Department of Education and Training and Inclusion Support Programme
 Department of Employment
 Department of Health
 Department of Home Affairs
 Department of Industry
 Department of Social Services
 Department of Veterans’ Affairs
 Workplace Gender Equality Agency
 All state & territory revenue offices

References 

Government software
Government services portals
E-government in Australia
2010 establishments in Australia
2020 disestablishments in Australia